Univers Zen ou de zéro à zéro is an album by Acid Mothers Temple & The Melting Paraiso U.F.O., released in 2002 by Fractal Records.  It was released as both a single CD and as a 4LP set including all the outtakes from the recording session and the bonus album Live in Europe 2002, recorded at Dachstock Reitschule, Berne, Switzerland on November 22, 2002.

CD Track listing
 "Electric Love Machine" – 10:33
 "Ange Mécanique de Saturne" ("Mechanical Angel of Saturn") – 10:31
 "Blues pour Bible Noire" ("Blues for Bible Black") – 21:40
 "Trinité Orphique" ("Orphic Trinity") – 2:31
 "Soleil de Cristal et Lune d'Argent" ("Crystal Sun and Silver Moon") – 22:25
 "God Bless AMT" – 3:42

4LP Track listing
 "Electric Love Machine"
 "Ange Mécanique de Saturne"
 "Blues pour Bible Noire"
 "Soleil de Cristal et Lune d'Argent"
 "La Femme Qui a Été Vendue par le Monde" ("The Woman Who was Sold by the World")
 "Trinité Orphique"
 "Hell Cats of Outer Space 1"
 "Hell Cats of Outer Space 2"
 "God Bless AMT"
 "Soleil de Cristal et Lune d'Argent (Live)"
 "Pink Lady Lemonade "You're So Magical" (Live)"

Credits
Credits, as stated on the Acid Mothers website:
 Kawabata Makoto - electric guitars, bouzouki, violin, tambura, speed guru
 Cotton Casino - vocals, synthesizer, beer & cigarette
 Tsuyama Atsushi - monster bass, vocals, acoustic guitar, cosmic joker
 Koizumi Hajime - drums, sleeping monk
 Higashi Hiroshi - synthesizer, dancin'king
 Magic Aum Gigi - Jews harp, erotic underground

Additional personnel
 Fother Moo - mooooooooooooooooooo
 Hiroshi Nar - guitar solo on "Electric love machine" (left channel)

References

External links
 Acid Mothers Temple & The Melting Paraiso U.F.O. site at fractal-records.com

2007 albums
Acid Mothers Temple albums